DXL may refer to:
 Destination XL Group, a specialty retailer of men's apparel
 Docetaxel, a chemotherapy medication
 Domino XML, a markup language used by IBM Notes
 DOORS Extension Language, a scripting language for IBM's Rational DOORS
 Dual X-ray absorptiometry and laser, a technique for calculating bone mineral density